Pavana Ganga is a 1977 Kannada-language film directed by Y. R. Swamy and produced by C. Jayaram. It is based on the novel of the same name by Krishnamoorthy Puranik. The film stars Srinath, Aarathi and Ashok. Ashok and Arathi were paired as brother and sister for the first time in their career. They went on to be paired as brother and sister four years later for one more time in Thayiya Madilalli.

Plot
Ganga is a village girl who runs away with her brother Narsimha because of her aunt mistreating her. She comes to Bangalore in search of a job and after several years she falls in love with Annayya (Srinath) Narsimha's friend. Narsimsha marries Yamuna a rich businessman's daughter. Yamuna does not like Ganga's interference in her married life. Will Ganga leave her brother's house or stay? Watch this movie to know more.

Cast 
 Srinath 
 Aarathi 
 Ashok
 Sathyapriya
 Dwarakish 
 H. R. Shastry
 B. V. Radha
 Balakrishna
 Sampath
 Musuri Krishnamurthy

Soundtrack 
The music was composed by Rajan–Nagendra with lyrics by Chi. Udaya Shankar. All the songs composed for the film were received extremely well and considered as evergreen songs.

References

External links 
 

1977 films
1970s Kannada-language films
Films scored by Rajan–Nagendra
Films based on Indian novels
Kannada literature
Films directed by Y. R. Swamy